Death From Above may refer to:

In music:
 The DJ nickname of musician James Murphy
 Death From Above Records, renamed DFA Records
 Death from Above (band), a Canadian music duo
 "Let's Make Love and Listen to Death from Above", a song by Brazilian band Cansei de Ser Sexy
 "Death from Above", a song on the b-side of "Tarantula" (The Smashing Pumpkins song)
 "Death from Above", a song from Thrice's 2016 album To Be Everywhere Is to Be Nowhere

Other:
 Death From Above (MechQuest), an animated short film featured in the web based game MechQuest

As mottoes or slogans:
 The motto ("Mors Ab Alto" in Latin) of the USAF 7th Bomb Wing
 The motto painted on the front of Lieutenant Colonel Bill Kilgore's helicopter in the 1979 film Apocalypse Now
 One motto for the United States Army's 82nd Airborne Division